Gemmula westaustralis is a species of sea snail, a marine gastropod mollusk in the family Turridae, the turrids.

Distribution
This marine species is endemic to Australia and occurs off Western Australia

References

 Kosuge, S. 1990. Report on the family Turridae collected along the north-western coast of Australia. Bulletin of the Institute of Malacology, Tokyo 2(9): 149-156, pls 54, 55

External links
  Tucker, J.K. 2004 Catalog of recent and fossil turrids (Mollusca: Gastropoda). Zootaxa 682:1-1295.

westaustralis
Gastropods described in 1990
Gastropods of Australia